Gladys Carmagnola (1939–2015) was a Paraguayan poet and teacher. She is one of the country's best known writers; her work is devoted to a wide audience, including works for children and adults.

She was born in Guarambaré city Central Department, Paraguay, January 2, 1939, daughter of Ramona and Carlos Herrera Udrizar Carmagnola, a descendant of Italians and died July 9, 2015.

Early life
Carmagnola shared her childhood with her brothers Carlos, the eldest, Haydee and Selva.
As early as adolescence she showed a natural inclination towards poetry.
From a very early age she was devoted to teaching, and simultaneously developing her poetic vocation.

Career
She is co-founder and member of the Society of Writers of Paraguay. She also had involvement in the founding of the group of Paraguayan Associated Writers and the Pen Club of Paraguay.

She is part of a generation of Paraguayan women who, early in the decade of the 1960s, made their literary production, occupying a very important area in the Paraguayan literature.

Her first steps in producing poetry, were directed towards children. Her first book of poems for children was called  "Ojitos negros", published in April 1965.

In addition to her many books published, several of her poems have been included in anthologies and literary publications, both in her country and other foreign nations.

Carmagnola is a writer from the group of contemporary writers that marked a new trend in the literature of Paraguay. Among them are: Eloy Fariña Núñez, Hérib Campos Cervera, Josefina Plá, Óscar Ferreiro, Elvio Romero, José Luis Appleyard, Ramiro Domínguez, José María Gómez Sanjurjo, Rubén Bareiro Saguier, Carlos Villagra Marsal, Jacobo Rauskin, Miguel Ángel Fernandez, Roque Vallejos, Emilio Pérez Chaves, Susy Delgado, and Mario Casartelli.

Poetic style
About her predilection for poetry for children, this author has pointed out: "… writing for children is my great commitment and my singular pride, as well."

In 1979, Mrs. Josefina Plá responded Carmagnola children's works: "There is tenderness in the book, a lot of tenderness, too if you do not know Gladys and  do not know that she is pure tenderness; that sweetness is her accent and her images of saccharin is not true but honey cookbook interlinings heart. "

Her poems for children have a sweet and inviting style, and allow readers to access their inner child. They produce a sense of delight and can transport readers back to the times of ice cream, daytime naps, and tireless games with friends.

It has also been echoed her work "Piolin", the Argentine author Maria Elena Walsh, who defined it as "transparent Piolin", for its literary beauty and clarity.

Since 1980, emerges a stage of maturity as a writer, moving their production toward a modern style. They emerge at this stage, poems that reflect an era intimately reflective of the poet and several poems of nature amatory.

Her work for adults rose in a language that is clear and transparent that feels like a breath of fresh air for readers.

Family
She married Julio Medina, a lawyer by profession. They had one daughter: Cecilia Medina Carmagnola.

Works
Her first publication dates back to 1965, since then, she has been devoted entirely to the production of poetic works, completing a total of 20 titles.

Awards and honors

Throughout her career she has been honored with numerous awards and tributes nationally and internationally.

Sources
 Virtual Word

External links
 Area Latino
 Poem of love
 Latin Spaces

1939 births
2015 deaths
People from Guarambaré
Paraguayan people of Italian descent
Paraguayan women poets
20th-century Paraguayan poets
21st-century Paraguayan poets
Paraguayan women children's writers
20th-century Paraguayan women writers
21st-century Paraguayan women writers